Elections to Windsor and Maidenhead Borough Council were held on 5 May 2011. The whole council was up for election and the Conservative Party retained its overall control of the council. The previous election was held in 2007.

Results
The results saw the Conservatives strengthen their hold on the council by gaining 15 seats from the Liberal Democrats. As a result, the Liberal Democrats were left with 1 seat, with independents and ratepayer groups having 5.

References

2011 English local elections
2011
2010s in Berkshire